Deep Creek is a locality in the Australian state of South Australia located on the south coast of the Fleurieu Peninsula overlooking Backstairs Passage about  south of the Adelaide city centre.

Deep Creek's boundaries were created in August 1999 along with the selection of its name which is derived from the watercourse located within its extent.

As of 2015, land use within the locality consists of land zoned both for primary production uses such as agriculture and zoned for conservation purposes such as the protected area known as Deep Creek Conservation Park and the coastline overlooking Backstairs Passage.

Deep Creek is located within the federal division of Mayo, the state electoral district of Mawson and the local government area of the District Council of Yankalilla.

See also
Deep Creek (disambiguation)

References

Towns in South Australia
Fleurieu Peninsula